Chijindu "CJ" Ujah (born 5 March 1994) is a British athlete, specializing as a sprinter. The lead-off runner of the Great Britain 4 × 100 metres relay team that won both the World title in 2017 and the European title in 2016 and 2018, he also won the title in the 100 metres at the 2017 Diamond League final. On 18 February 2022 it was announced that Ujah and his teammates Zharnel Hughes, Nethaneel Mitchell-Blake and Richard Kilty would be stripped of their 4 × 100 metres relay 2020 Summer Olympics silver medals after Court of Arbitration for Sport found Ujah guilty of a doping violation.

Early life and education
Chijindu Ujah was born in Enfield, London, into a family who are originally from Nigeria. He grew up in Enfield and has one older sibling. He attended St. Matthew's CE Primary School and Bishop Stopford's School alongside his brother. Chijindu went on to study at Sir George Monoux College, a sixth form college in Walthamstow, where he took up Science and Maths. He studied Exercise Science at Middlesex University in London.

Career
Ujah is the fifth British sprinter to break 10 seconds for the 100 metres, and the youngest to do so, as of June 2014 he is ranked first on the all-time European under-20 list, and third on both the all-time British list and the all-time European under-23 list for the event with a fastest time of 9.96 (with a +1.4 tailwind), achieved at Hengelo, Netherlands on 8 June 2014.

He is coached by Jonas Tawiah-Dodoo.

In 2013, he became the European Junior Champion in the 100 m.

At youth level, Ujah won the silver medal over 100 metres at the 2011 Commonwealth Youth Games He also finished 8th in the IAAF World Youth Games 100 m. In 2012, he came 6th in the IAAF World Junior Championships 100 m.

On 14 February 2015, Chijindu Ujah won the Sainsbury's Indoor British Championships 60 m with a time of 6.57 seconds.

At the 2016 Summer Olympics from Rio de Janeiro, he failed to make the final of the 100 metres by 0.01 seconds.

He ran the first leg in the 4 × 100 metres relay for Great Britain, the gold medal winning team at the 2017 World Championships in London on 12 August. Two weeks later, he won his first global individual title, winning the 2017 IAAF Diamond League title over 100 metres in 9.97 seconds.

Drugs controversy

At the Tokyo 2020 Summer Olympics, he won a silver medal for the 4x100 men's relay event. He was later provisionally suspended for an alleged doping violation after his doping test showed the presence of a prohibited substance S-23 and Enobosarm. On 14 September 2021 it was announced that his 'B' sample had also tested positive, confirming the initial test and "almost certainly" resulting in the relay team being disqualified and losing their medals. On 18 February 2022, having not appealed the findings of the test, the British relay team had their medals officially stripped. Ujah stated that he had "unknowingly consumed a contaminated substance". On 10 October 2022, Ujah was banned for 22 months, backdating to 6 August 2021 and ending on 5 June 2023. Despite the ban, Ujah was cleared of intentionally taking prohibited drugs by the AIU and the World Anti-Doping Agency.

References

External links

1994 births
Living people
Athletes from London
English male sprinters
British male sprinters
Olympic male sprinters
Olympic athletes of Great Britain
Athletes (track and field) at the 2016 Summer Olympics
Athletes (track and field) at the 2020 Summer Olympics
World Athletics Championships athletes for Great Britain
World Athletics Championships medalists
World Athletics Championships winners
European Athletics Championships winners
European Athletics Championships medalists
British Athletics Championships winners
Diamond League winners
People educated at Sir George Monoux College
English people of Nigerian descent
Black British sportspeople
Competitors stripped of Summer Olympics medals
Doping cases in athletics
English sportspeople in doping cases